The little auk or dovekie (Alle alle) is a small auk, the only member of the genus Alle. Alle is the Sami name of the long-tailed duck; it is onomatopoeic and imitates the call of the drake duck. Linnaeus was not particularly familiar with the winter plumages of either the auk or the duck, and appears to have confused the two species.  Other common names include rotch, rotche, and sea dove, although this last sometimes refers to a different auk, the Black Guillemot, instead.

It breeds on islands in the high Arctic. There are two subspecies: A. a. alle breeds in Greenland, Novaya Zemlya and Svalbard, and A. a. polaris on Franz Josef Land. A small number of individuals breed on Little Diomede Island in the Bering Strait with additional breeding individuals thought to occur on King Island, St. Lawrence Island, St. Matthew Island and the Pribilof Islands in the Bering Sea.

Morphology and behaviour
This is the only Atlantic auk of its size, half the size of the Atlantic puffin at 19–21 cm in length, with a 34–38 cm wingspan. The dovekie's weight ranges from 4.7 to 7.2 oz (134-204 g). Adult birds are black on the head, neck, back and wings, with white underparts. The bill is very short and stubby. They have a small rounded black tail. The lower face and fore neck become white in winter.

The flight is direct, with fast whirring wing beats due to the short wings. These birds forage for food like other auks by swimming underwater. They mainly eat crustaceans, especially copepods, of which a 150 g bird requires ~60,000 individuals per day (equivalent to 30 g of dry food weight), but they can also eat small invertebrates and fish. Recent evidence suggests that the little auk feeds not by filter-feeding, but by visually guided suction-feeding. They feed closer to the shoreline during nesting season, but when not nesting they scavenge for food in the open-ocean.

Little auks produce a variety of twitters and cackling calls at the breeding colonies, but are silent at sea.

Ecology
Little auks breed in large colonies on marine cliffsides. They nest in crevices or beneath large rocks, usually laying just a single egg. They move south in winter into northern areas of the north Atlantic. Late autumn storms may carry them south of their normal wintering areas, or into the North Sea. The species is also commonly found in the Norwegian Sea.

The glaucous gull and the Arctic fox are the main predators on little auks. In some cases, the polar bear has also been reported to feed on little auk eggs.

Conservation
Although populations appear to be decreasing, this is not currently thought to be rapid enough to be of concern for the species in the medium term, especially as global little auk numbers are generally rather fluid. Little auks have been shown to be able to buffer fluctuations in prey availability, caused by climate change, via plasticity in their foraging behavior, which is likely to make accurate conservation assessments more difficult.

As human food
Kiviaq is an Inuit dish from Greenland. It is made by stuffing a seal skin with 300 to 500 little auks. Once full and airtight, the skin is sealed with seal fat and the little auks are left to ferment for 3 to 18 months under a pile of rocks. Caught in spring, little auks are a human food resource in winter.

Knud Rasmussen's death is attributed to food poisoning by kiviaq.

On the south coast of Newfoundland, Canada the Little Auk was known locally as the Bull(y) Bird or Ice Bird. The birds were stuffed with savoury dressing and oven-baked. It was a food of last resort to prevent winter starvation amongst the fisher people of Newfoundland’s outports prior to Canada’s Confederation in 1949. Shot with BB pellets on ice pans off Newfoundland’s south coast, a feed would consist of 5-6 birds per person. They were hunted as long as the ice pans remained in the vicinity. Their flesh is dark and lean.

See also
 Great auk

References

External links 

 
 Feathers of Little Auk (Alle alle)

Alcinae
little auk
Birds of the Arctic
Birds of Greenland
Little auk
little auk
little auk
Articles containing video clips